1804 Chebotarev is a stony background asteroid from the inner regions of the asteroid belt, approximately 10 kilometers in diameter. It was discovered on 6 April 1967, by Russian astronomer Tamara Smirnova at the Crimean Astrophysical Observatory in Nauchnyj on the Crimean peninsula. The asteroid was named after Soviet astronomer .

Orbit and classification 

The stony S-type asteroid orbits the Sun in the inner main-belt at a distance of 2.4–2.5 AU once every 3 years and 9 months (1,367 days). Its orbit has an eccentricity of 0.02 and an inclination of 4° with respect to the ecliptic.

Physical characteristics

Rotation period 

In February 2004, a rotational lightcurve of Chebotarev was obtained from photometric observations by French amateur astronomer Laurent Bernasconi. It gave a well-defined rotation period of 4.026 hours with a brightness amplitude of 0.41 magnitude.

Diameter and albedo 

According to the survey carried out by NASA's Wide-field Infrared Survey Explorer with its subsequent NEOWISE mission, Chebotarev measures 9.15 kilometers in diameter, and its surface has a high albedo of 0.501, while the Collaborative Asteroid Lightcurve Link assumes a standard albedo for stony asteroids of 0.20 and calculates a diameter of 10.79 kilometers with an absolute magnitude of 12.2.

Naming 

This minor planet was named in honor of G. A. Chebotarev (1913–1975), who was a professor and the director of the Institute of Theoretical Astronomy as well as president of IAU's Commission 20, (Positions & Motions of Minor Planets, Comets & Satellites). He is known for his work on celestial mechanics of asteroids, comets and satellites. The official  was published by the Minor Planet Center on 1 January 1974.

References

External links 
 Asteroid Lightcurve Database (LCDB), query form (info )
 Dictionary of Minor Planet Names, Google books
 Asteroids and comets rotation curves, CdR – Observatoire de Genève, Raoul Behrend
 Discovery Circumstances: Numbered Minor Planets (1)-(5000) – Minor Planet Center
 
 

001804
Discoveries by Tamara Mikhaylovna Smirnova
Named minor planets
19670406